Ralf Souquet (born 29 November 1968) is a German professional pool player. His nickname is "The Kaiser". Souquet is considered one of the greatest pool players of all time.

Since 1988, he has won more than 200 tournament titles, including 23 Euro Tour titles, 20 European Pool Championship and 12 German Pool Championship. Souquet is a two-time world champion, winning the 2008 WPA World Eight-ball Championship and 1996 WPA World Nine-ball Championship.

Career
Souquet began playing billiards at the age of six in his parents' pub, practicing up to five hours per day.  He won his first German Championship title at the age of fourteen in the juniors division.  In 1985, Souquet co-won his first European Championship team title with the National Team, and in 1986 won his first individual title at the European Championship (juniors division).

In 1997, he received the Silberne Lorbeerblatt (Silver Laurel Leaf), the highest official distinction awarded to sportspeople by Germany, which was presented to him by German President Roman Herzog.

In 1996, Souquet won the WPA World Nine-ball Championship where he triumphed over Tom Storm of Sweden. He also reached the finals of the same event in 2001 and 2006, only to be bested by Mika Immonen and Ronato Alcano.

In 2000, Souquet won the BCA U.S. Open Straight Pool Championship and also won the U.S. Open 9-Ball Championship in 2002 by defeating Alex Pagulayan who would also win the event in the next three years.

In 2008, Souquet won his second world title at the WPA World Eight-ball Championship with a victory over Ronnie Alcano.

Titles and achievements

References

External links
 Ralf Souquet official website
 An industry profile of Souquet
 Article on his 2006 World Pool Masters victory
 Article on his 2006 World Pool Championship loss

1968 births
Living people
German pool players
World champions in pool
People from Eschweiler
Sportspeople from Cologne (region)
World Games gold medalists
World Games silver medalists
Competitors at the 2001 World Games
Competitors at the 2009 World Games
WPA World Eight-ball Champions
WPA World Nine-ball Champions
Competitors at the 2005 World Games